Bavers (also Romanized as Bāvers; also known as Yāvers) is a former village in Hesar Kharvan Rural District, Mohammadiyeh District, Alborz County, Qazvin Province, Iran. At the 2006 census, its population was 1,858, in 465 families. The former villages of Bavers and Zibashahr came together to create the city of Mohammadiyeh.

References 

Populated places in Alborz County